Samsondin Ouro (born 2 March 2000) is a footballer who plays as a midfielder for Slovenian PrvaLiga side Radomlje, on loan from Mura. Born in Germany, he plays for the Togo national team.

Club career
In 2019, Ouro joined the youth academy of Dinamo Zagreb, Croatia's most successful club, from the youth academy of SSV Reutlingen.

Before the second half of the 2020–21 season, he signed for the Slovenian top flight side Mura.

International career
Born in Germany, Ouro is of Togolese descent. He debuted for the Togo national team in a 3–0 friendly win over Sierra Leone on 24 March 2022.

Honours
Mura
Slovenian PrvaLiga: 2020–21

References

External links
 
 
 

2000 births
Living people
People from Reutlingen
Sportspeople from Tübingen (region)
Footballers from Baden-Württemberg
Togolese footballers
Togo international footballers
German footballers
German people of Togolese descent
Association football midfielders
GNK Dinamo Zagreb II players
NŠ Mura players
NK Radomlje players
Slovenian PrvaLiga players
Togolese expatriate footballers
German expatriate footballers
Expatriate footballers in Croatia
Expatriate footballers in Slovenia
Togolese expatriate sportspeople in Slovenia
German expatriate sportspeople in Croatia
German expatriate sportspeople in Slovenia